Nebojša Šćepanović (born 4 December 1967) is a Montenegrin retired football midfielder.

External links
 La Liga player stats
 
 

1967 births
Living people
Footballers from Podgorica
Association football midfielders
Yugoslav footballers
Serbia and Montenegro footballers
FC Prishtina players
FK Budućnost Podgorica players
FK Sutjeska Nikšić players
FK Vojvodina players
Real Oviedo players
Villarreal CF players
Paniliakos F.C. players
Kozani F.C. players
Yugoslav Second League players
Yugoslav First League players
Second League of Serbia and Montenegro players
First League of Serbia and Montenegro players
La Liga players
Super League Greece players
Serbia and Montenegro expatriate footballers
Expatriate footballers in Spain
Serbia and Montenegro expatriate sportspeople in Spain
Expatriate footballers in Greece
Serbia and Montenegro expatriate sportspeople in Greece